Shpaki is a rural locality (a khutor) in Novotikhonovskoye Rural Settlement, Staropoltavsky District, Volgograd Oblast, Russia. The population was 132 as of 2010. There are 3 streets.

Geography 
Shpaki is located in steppe, near the left bank of the Yeruslan River, 22 km southwest of Staraya Poltavka (the district's administrative centre) by road. Valuyevka is the nearest rural locality.

References 

Rural localities in Staropoltavsky District